Alice Birch is a British playwright and screenwriter. Birch has written several plays, including Revolt. She Said. Revolt Again. for which she was awarded the George Devine Award for Most Promising New Playwright, and Anatomy of a Suicide for which she won the Susan Smith Blackburn Prize. Birch was also the screenwriter for the film Lady Macbeth and has written for such television shows as Succession and Normal People.

Early life 
Birch spent the first five years of her life living with her family at a commune. Because her parents were unmarried, they decided to give Alice and her sister the last name Birch after the commune's name, Birchwood Hall.

At 18, Birch joined the Royal Court Theatre’s young writers program and spent a three-month unpaid internship in Los Angeles working for the film production company BenderSpink.

Birch attended Exeter University for her undergraduate degree.

Career 
In 2010, Birch participated in 24 Hour Plays at the Old Vic in which writers, directors, actors, and other creatives have 24 hours to create a new play before it is performed. The playwrights were given 6 hours to write a play 15 minutes in length. Birch's play was called And Then There Were Four Little Beats of Four Little Hearts on the Edge of the World.

Birch's first performed full-length play was Many Moons, which premiered in 2011 at Theatre 503 under the direction of Derek Bond. The play follows four characters whose lives seem separate, but then collide. Birch was nominated for the 2011/12 Susan Smith Blackburn prize, an award recognising female playwrights writing in the English language, for Many Moons.

In 2013, Birch's episode of the radio comedy Absolutely Delish was broadcast on BBC Radio 4. Also in 2013, Birch's play Little on the Inside premiered at Latitude Festival. The play is set inside a women's prison.

Birch co-wrote the play Astronauts with a group of 16-19 year olds who later performed the work. Astronauts was inspired by the housing crisis. The play premiered in 2014 with Company Three. Little Light is one of Birch's first plays, though it was not performed until 2015 when it premiered at the Orange Tree Theatre.

Birch's play Revolt. She Said. Revolt Again. was commissioned by the Royal Shakespeare Company, which gave her the prompt, "Well-behaved women seldom make history". Birch wrote the play in three days. The play was inspired by Valerie Solanas' SCUM Manifesto, though Birch took inspiration more from the power behind Solanas' words than from the messages of that work. Revolt premiered with the Royal Shakespeare Company in 2014 as part of Midsummer Mischief. Birch was nominated for the 2014/15 Susan Smith Blackburn prize for writing Revolt and won the George Devine Award for Most Promising New Playwright.

In 2015, Birch developed the play We Want You to Watch with the feminist theatre company RashDash. We Want You to Watch was commissioned by the National Theatre. The play protests the violent and graphic world created by pornography and raises the idea of getting rid of pornography in its entirety. The same year, her play for children, The Lone Pine Club, premiered as a touring production. Birch adapted the story from Malcolm Saville's children's books.

Birch's Ophelias Zimmer (Ophelia's Room, in English) premiered at the Schaubühne in Berlin in December 2015. The play made its debut in England in early 2016 but was performed in German with English surtitles. Ophelias Zimmer explores the character of Ophelia from William Shakespeare's Hamlet. The play was a collaboration between Birch, director Katie Mitchell, and designer Chloe Lamford. Ophelias Zimmer was nominated for the Friedrich-Luft Preis.

In 2016, Birch made her screenwriting debut with the film Lady Macbeth, based on Nikolai Leskov's novel Lady Macbeth Of The Mtsensk District. Birch made several changes from the novel, including setting the film in rural England. Birch won a 2017 British Independent Film Award for best screenplay for Lady Macbeth. Birch was also nominated for a BAFTA and for Best Debut Screenwriter at the British Independent Film Awards for Lady Macbeth.

In 2016, it was announced that Birch would pen the TV-adaptation of Mary Gabriel's Love and Capital, a biography of the Karl Marx and the Marx family. There have been no further announcements about this television series. Also that year, Birch and British director Katie Mitchell adapted Elfriede Jelinek's Schatten (Eurydike sagt) (Shadow (Eurydice Speaks) in English).

In 2017, Birch's play Anatomy of a Suicide premiered at the Royal Court Theatre in London under the direction of Katie Mitchell. Anatomy of a Suicide won Birch the 2018 Susan Smith Blackburn Prize. Anatomy of a Suicide follows three generations of women affected by mental illness in the 1970s, 1990s, and the 2030s whose stories are presented to the audience simultaneously. Birch was interested in exploring the effects of having a mother who commits suicide and whether trauma can be passed on through DNA.

In 2018, Birch adapted Marguerite Duras' novella La Maladie de la Mort (or, in English, The Malady of Death) for the stage. The play premiered at the Edinburgh Fringe Festival that year and was directed by Katie Mitchell.

[BLANK] was co-commissioned by National Theatre Connections and Clean Break. The play consists of 100 mix-and-match scenes, comprising over 400 pages, which a production is to choose from. The scenes are vignettes about women and the criminal justice system. The 2019 premiere of [BLANK] at the Donmar Warehouse with Clean Break performed 22 of the 100 scenes.

In 2019, Birch adapted Virginia Woolf's Orlando into German. The adaptation was performed at the Shaubühne and directed by Katie Mitchell.

Birch adapted Sally Rooney's novel Normal People for television with Rooney herself and writer Mark O'Rowe. The Normal People TV series was released in April 2020. Before the release of Normal People, it was announced that Birch would also adapt Rooney's novel Conversations with Friends for television.

Birch's opera, Violet, composed by Tom Coult, was scheduled to open at the Aldeburgh Festival in June 2020. The opera was commissioned and produced by Music Theatre Wales, Theater Magdeburg, and Snape Maltings, with the London Sinfonietta. The two created Violet in 2019. The opera's premiere was delayed because of the COVID-19 pandemic, eventually taking place at Aldeburgh in June 2022. Jude Christian's production starred soprano Anna Dennis as Violet with accompaniment by the London Sinfonietta conducted by Andrew Gourlay. The production went on to tour the UK.

Birch has worked with director Katie Mitchell many times. Mitchell has directed Birch's Ophelias Zimmer, Anatomy of a Suicide, and La Maladie de la Mort. In October 2020, her adaptation of Rachel Cusk's Outline trilogy was set to be directed by Mitchell at the National Theatre. The production was indefinitely postponed due to the COVID-19 pandemic.

Birch adapted Graham Swift's 2016 novel Mothering Sunday. The film of the same name premiered at the 2021 Cannes Film Festival. In August 2020, it was announced that Birch would write the television reimagining of Dead Ringers, set to star Rachel Weisz.

In 2022, The Wonder, for which Birch co-wrote the screenplay with Sebastián Lelio and Emma Donoghue, adapted from Donoghue's novel of the same name, premiered.

Bibliography 

 Many Moons
 Little on the Inside
 Astronauts
 Little Light
 Revolt. She Said. Revolt Again.
 We Want You to Watch
 The Lone Pine Club
 Ophelias Zimmer (German with English surtitles)
 Anatomy of a Suicide
 La Maladie de la Mort (French with English subtitles)
 [BLANK]
 Outline. Transit. Kudos.

Filmography

Film 
Writer:

 Lady Macbeth (2016)
 Mothering Sunday (2021)
 The Wonder (2022)

Television 
Writer:

 Normal People (2020)
 Conversations with Friends (2022)
 Dead Ringers (TBA) 

Story Editor:

 Succession (Season 2)

Awards

References

External links
 

20th-century English women writers
20th-century English dramatists and playwrights
20th-century British writers
21st-century English women writers
21st-century British writers
British screenwriters
British women screenwriters
English women dramatists and playwrights
British women television writers
Writers Guild of America Award winners
Alumni of the University of Exeter
Living people
1986 births